Andrew Jenkins may refer to:
 Andrew Jenkins (songwriter)
 Andrew Jenkins (actor)
 Andrew Jenkins (politician)
 Andrew Jenkins (music executive)